The 202nd QC Ready Reserve Battalion, 1502nd Infantry Brigade (Ready Reserve), known officially as The Second to None 202nd, is one of the battalions of the Philippine Army Reserve Command, which is organic to the 1502nd Quezon City Ready Reserve Brigade. It is an infantry unit, and specializes in MOUT, disaster relief, and Civil Military Operations.

Organization
The following are the units that are presently placed under operational control of the 202nd QC Ready Reserve Battalion:
Notable Commanders;
 Brigadier General. Reynaldo B, Ebron† 
 Major. Romeo R, Rillon

Base units
   Headquarters & Headquarters Company

Line units
   "A" (DEARRT) Company
   "B" Infantry Company
   "C" Infantry Company

Full Set Of Ranks
Commissioned Officials
 Bridgadier General
 Colonel
 Lieutenant Colonel
 Major
 Captain
 First Lieutenant
 Second Lieutenant
Non Commissioned Officers
 First Chief Master Sergeant
 Chief Master Sergeant
 Senior Master Sergeant
 Master Sergeant
 Technical Sergeant
 Staff Sergeant
 Sergeant
 Corporal
 Private First Class
 Private

Operations
 Security Augmentation – ASEAN Regional Summit (11 Jan 7 – 14 Jan 07)
 Disaster SAR, Relief and Rehabilitation Operations (TF Ondoy) (27 Sep 9 – 15 Oct 09)
 Security Operations OPLAN Kaluluwa (TF Casper) (21 Oct 9 – 2 Nov 09)
 Security Operations (TF HOPE) (2010 Elections) (9 May 2010 – 12 May 2010)
 Disaster SAR, Relief and Rehabilitation Operations (TF Habagat) (05 Aug 12 – 12 Aug 12)
 Disaster SAR, Relief and Rehabilitation Operations (TF Maring) (16 Aug 13 – 24 Aug 13)
 Relief Operations (TF Yolanda) (6 Nov 13 – 15 Nov 13)
 Standby Augmentation Force (Ormoc) (TF Yolanda) (6 Nov 13 – 15 Nov 13)
 Disaster SAR, Relief and Rehabilitation Operations (TF Glenda) (16 Jul 14 - 17 Jul 14)
 Disaster SAR, Relief and Rehabilitation Operations (TF Mario) (19 Sep 14 - 21 Sep 14)

Awards and decorations

Campaign streamers

Badges

See also
 1502nd Infantry Brigade (Ready Reserve)
 201st Infantry Battalion (Ready Reserve)
 1st Technical & Administrative Services Battalion (Ready Reserve)

References
Citations

Bibliography

 General Orders Nr 233, HARESCOM dated 20 July 2006
 Training Committee, SBCMT Manual, 2006, 1502IBDE.

Battalions of the Philippines
Military units and formations of the Philippine Army
Department of National Defense (Philippines)
Reserve and Auxiliary Units of the Philippine Military